Albert Plesman (7 September 1889 – 31 December 1953) was a Dutch  pioneer in aviation and the first administrator and later director of the KLM, the oldest airline in the world still operating under its original name.
Until his death, he was in charge as CEO for over 35 years and was  also on the board of the Dutch airline, which was to become one of the most important airlines in the world under his leadership.

He was born as the son of an egg trader from The Hague. In 1915 he joined the mobilized Dutch airforce as a professional officer, at the time still called the "militaire luchtvaartafdeling" (military aviation department), in Soesterberg. After World War I, in which the Netherlands remained neutral, he started the organization of ELTA, the "Eerste Luchtverkeer Tentoonstelling Amsterdam" (First Aviation Exhibition Amsterdam), held from 1 August till 14 September 1919. For that occasion enormous halls (hangars) were built. Right after the exhibition these were used by Anthony Fokker, for his new  company Nederlandse Vliegtuigenfabriek (Dutch Aircraft Factory), subsequently the Fokker airplane factory.

All these activities led to the establishment of the Royal Dutch Airlines (KLM), of which Plesman became director, and which he made a flourishing company. After World War II Plesman was appointed president-director of KLM. After the recovery from the war the company became a renowned airline company under his leadership. On 25 February 1946, KLM had the first airline flights from continental Europe to the USA. For his efforts he received in 1947 an honorary doctorate of the Technical University of Delft. Plesman pleaded in vain for a displacement of Schiphol Airport to a location near Burgerveen. The father of the KLM died in The Hague on December 31, 1953, at age 64.

Biography 
Albert Plesman was born on 7 September 1889 to his father, Johan Cornelis Plesman, an egg trader from The Hague and his mother Hendrika van Wessel. He was one of 7 children in the Plesman household. Albert Plesman was raised in Protestant household under the strict rule of his father. He was known to have episodes of obscure or sporadic behavior. These episodes led him to attending the Hogere Burgerschool, a preparatory academy in The Hague of Netherlands. Albert realized great strengths in the mathematics with his time at the school, which spawned an interest in commercial aviation.

Upon the death of his mother and his graduation from Hogere Burgerschool, Plesman decided to begin schooling with the Alkmaar Cadet School for service in Royal Dutch East Indies Army. He then attended the Royal Military Academy in Breda, Netherlands, where he first explored his interest in aviation through access to the Gilze-Rijen airfield. Plesman then began his tenure as 2nd lieutenant where his access to aviation expanded. He was exposed to a lieutenant pilot named W.C.J. Versteegh, who flew in a Farman F.20. Plesman was able to explore his desire to fly through Verstegh. Plesman officially became a student cadet of flight in April 1917.

Albert Plesman then met Susanna Jacoba van Eijk in early 1917, who he later married in December of that year. Van Eijk gave birth to 3 sons and 1 daughter with Albert. Albert Plesman was recalled as a great family man who realized the importance in family togetherness. He would regularly bring his children to important meetings and events within his company, which was a generally uncommon practice for his socioeconomic stature.

Aviation career 
Albert Plesman, together with Anthony Fokker, allowed for the existence of two great Aviation companies in Europe; KLM and Fokker. Europe realized greater connections with North America through Plesman's influence as he pioneered the first commercial transatlantic services. Cargo, mail, and passenger services were greatly a result of Plesman's work within KLM.

KLM's first revenue flight operated from London's Croydon Airport to Amsterdam Airport Schiphol. KLM leased their first aircraft, but quickly utilized Fokker. These Fokker aircraft were a product of Anthony Fokker and Albert Plesman's leadership. Their operation of aircraft production followed by the commercial use of those aircraft allowed for a huge growth in travel for Europe internally, to North America, and to the Southeast Asian Dutch Colonies. Albert Plesman later established, in 1921, the largest aircraft maintenance and overhaul plant in the world. This plant was located onsite at Amsterdam Airport Schiphol, where KLM concentrated most of their operations. Plesman laid ground for the new KLM headquarters in The Hague during the year of 1939. Plesman advertised progressive business principles for KLM - "a commitment to generating customer preference by offering a high-quality product at a reasonable price; strengthening market presence; and achieving internationally competitive costs coupled with a sound financial basis." KLM then moved away from the wooden Fokker airplane and transitioned to metal aircraft manufactured in the United States, per Plesman's discretion.

In the latter part of 1939, Albert Plesman was forced to suspend all of KLM's operations in the advent of Second World War. His aircraft were withheld and Amsterdam Airport Schiphol came under exclusive military use. He resumed operations in 1946. When KLM was revived, he was officially titled President of the company and conducted the integration of Douglas aircraft. He also allowed for greater nationalization of the airline and oversaw the Dutch government's purchase of shares in KLM.

Albert Plesman died on December 31, 1953, He left the company in the hands of Fons Aler. The airline continued to grow despite economic difficulties in the late 1950s due to the Dutch government's growing ownership of the company.

Decorations and awards 
 Knight of the Order of Orange-Nassau (1925)
 Officer of the Order of Orange-Nassau (1931)
 Knight of the Order of the Netherlands Lion (1934)
 Commander of the Order of Orange-Nassau (1949, at the 30th anniversary of KLM)
 Knight of the Order of the Dannebrog (Denmark, 1931)
 Officer of the Order of Leopold II (Belgium, 1932)
 Officer of the Order of Vasa (Sweden, 1932)
 Commander of the Order of Leopold II (Belgium, 1935)
 Commander of the Order of the White Lion (Czechoslovak, 1935)
 Honorary doctorate from the Technical University of Delft (1947)
 The first Edward Warner Award, for his achievements for international civil aviation (International Civil Aviation Organization, posthumously, 1959)
 C.J. Snijders Medal

Publications
 Plan for international cooperation
 MOVIE: KING OF THE SKIES, 2021

References

1889 births
1953 deaths
Air France–KLM
Businesspeople from The Hague
Dutch aviators
Dutch corporate directors
Dutch chief executives in the airline industry
Knights of the Order of the Netherlands Lion
Commanders of the Order of Orange-Nassau
Knights of the Order of the Dannebrog
Commanders of the Order of Leopold II
Recipients of the Order of Vasa
Commanders of the Order of the White Lion
20th-century Dutch businesspeople